Thermoregulation is the ability of an organism to keep its body temperature within certain boundaries, even when the surrounding temperature is very different. A thermoconforming organism, by contrast, simply adopts the surrounding temperature as its own body temperature, thus avoiding the need for internal thermoregulation. The internal thermoregulation process is one aspect of homeostasis: a state of dynamic stability in an organism's internal conditions, maintained far from thermal equilibrium with its environment (the study of such processes in zoology has been called physiological ecology). If the body is unable to maintain a normal temperature and it increases significantly above normal, a condition known as hyperthermia occurs. Humans may also experience lethal hyperthermia when the wet bulb temperature is sustained above  for six hours. The opposite condition, when body temperature decreases below normal levels, is known as hypothermia. It results when the homeostatic control mechanisms of heat within the body malfunction, causing the body to lose heat faster than producing it. Usually caused by prolonged exposure to cold temperatures, hypothermia is usually treated by methods that attempt to raise the body temperature back to a normal range.

It was not until the introduction of thermometers that any exact data on the temperature of animals could be obtained. It was then found that local differences were present, since heat production and heat loss vary considerably in different parts of the body, although the circulation of the blood tends to bring about a mean temperature of the internal parts. Hence it is important to identify the parts of the body that most closely reflect the temperature of the internal organs. Also, for such results to be comparable, the measurements must be conducted under comparable conditions. The rectum has traditionally been considered to reflect most accurately the temperature of internal parts, or in some cases of sex or species, the vagina, uterus or bladder.

Some animals undergo one of various forms of dormancy where the thermoregulation process temporarily allows the body temperature to drop, thereby conserving energy. Examples include hibernating bears and torpor in bats.

Classification of animals by thermal characteristics

Endothermy vs. ectothermy
Thermoregulation in organisms runs along a spectrum from endothermy to ectothermy. Endotherms create most of their heat via metabolic processes and are colloquially referred to as warm-blooded. When the surrounding temperatures are cold, endotherms increase metabolic heat production to keep their body temperature constant, thus making the internal body temperature of an endotherm more or less independent of the temperature of the environment. Endotherms possess a larger number of mitochondria per cell than ectotherms, enabling them to generate more heat by increasing the rate at which they metabolize fats and sugars. Ectotherms use external sources of temperature to regulate their body temperatures. They are colloquially referred to as cold-blooded despite the fact that body temperatures often stay within the same temperature ranges as warm-blooded animals. Ectotherms are the opposite of endotherms when it comes to regulating internal temperatures. In ectotherms, the internal physiological sources of heat are of negligible importance; the biggest factor that enables them to maintain adequate body temperatures is due to environmental influences. Living in areas that maintain a constant temperature throughout the year, like the tropics or the ocean, has enabled ectotherms to develop behavioral mechanisms that respond to external temperatures, such as sun-bathing to increase body temperature, or seeking the cover of shade to lower body temperature.

Ectotherms

Ectothermic cooling
 Vaporization:
 Evaporation of sweat and other bodily fluids.
 Convection:
 Increasing blood flow to body surfaces to maximize heat transfer across the advective gradient.
 Conduction:
 Losing heat by being in contact with a colder surface. For instance:
 Lying on cool ground.
 Staying wet in a river, lake or sea.
 Covering in cool mud.
 Radiation:
 Releasing heat by radiating it away from the body.

Ectothermic heating (or minimizing heat loss)

 Convection:
 Climbing to higher ground up trees, ridges, rocks.
 Entering a warm water or air current.
 Building an insulated nest or burrow.
 Conduction:
 Lying on a hot surface.
 Radiation:
 Lying in the sun (heating this way is affected by the body's angle in relation to the sun).
 Folding skin to reduce exposure.
 Concealing wing surfaces.
 Exposing wing surfaces.
 Insulation:
 Changing shape to alter surface/volume ratio.
 Inflating the body.

To cope with low temperatures, some fish have developed the ability to remain functional even when the water temperature is below freezing; some use natural antifreeze or antifreeze proteins to resist ice crystal formation in their tissues. Amphibians and reptiles cope with heat gain by evaporative cooling and behavioral adaptations. An example of behavioral adaptation is that of a lizard lying in the sun on a hot rock in order to heat through radiation and conduction.

Endothermy

An endotherm is an animal that regulates its own body temperature, typically by keeping it at a constant level. To regulate body temperature, an organism may need to prevent heat gains in arid environments. Evaporation of water, either across respiratory surfaces or across the skin in those animals possessing sweat glands, helps in cooling body temperature to within the organism's tolerance range. Animals with a body covered by fur have limited ability to sweat, relying heavily on panting to increase evaporation of water across the moist surfaces of the lungs and the tongue and mouth. Mammals like cats, dogs and pigs, rely on panting or other means for thermal regulation and have sweat glands only in foot pads and snout. The sweat produced on pads of paws and on palms and soles mostly serves to increase friction and enhance grip. Birds also counteract overheating by gular fluttering, or rapid vibrations of the gular (throat) skin. Down feathers trap warm air acting as excellent insulators just as hair in mammals acts as a good insulator. Mammalian skin is much thicker than that of birds and often has a continuous layer of insulating fat beneath the dermis. In marine mammals, such as whales, or animals that live in very cold regions, such as the polar bears, this is called blubber. Dense coats found in desert endotherms also aid in preventing heat gain such as in the case of the camels.

A cold weather strategy is to temporarily decrease metabolic rate, decreasing the temperature difference between the animal and the air and thereby minimizing heat loss. Furthermore, having a lower metabolic rate is less energetically expensive. Many animals survive cold frosty nights through torpor, a short-term temporary drop in body temperature. Organisms, when presented with the problem of regulating body temperature, have not only behavioural, physiological, and structural adaptations but also a feedback system to trigger these adaptations to regulate temperature accordingly. The main features of this system are stimulus, receptor, modulator, effector and then the feedback of the newly adjusted temperature to the stimulus. This cyclical process aids in homeostasis.

Homeothermy compared with poikilothermy
Homeothermy and poikilothermy refer to how stable an organism's deep-body temperature is. Most endothermic organisms are homeothermic, like mammals. However, animals with facultative endothermy are often poikilothermic, meaning their temperature can vary considerably. Most fish are ectotherms, as most of their heat comes from the surrounding water. However, almost all fish are poikilothermic.

Vertebrates
By numerous observations upon humans and other animals, John Hunter showed that the essential difference between the so-called warm-blooded and cold-blooded animals lies in observed constancy of the temperature of the former, and the observed variability of the temperature of the latter. Almost all birds and mammals have a high temperature almost constant and independent of that of the surrounding air (homeothermy). Almost all other animals display a variation of body temperature, dependent on their surroundings (poikilothermy).

Brain control
Thermoregulation in both ectotherms and endotherms is controlled mainly by the preoptic area of the anterior hypothalamus. Such homeostatic control is separate from the sensation of temperature.

In birds and mammals

In cold environments, birds and mammals employ the following adaptations and strategies to minimize heat loss:
 Using small smooth muscles (arrector pili in mammals), which are attached to feather or hair shafts; this distorts the surface of the skin making feather/hair shaft stand erect (called goose bumps or pimples) which slows the movement of air across the skin and minimizes heat loss.
 Increasing body size to more easily maintain core body temperature (warm-blooded animals in cold climates tend to be larger than similar species in warmer climates (see Bergmann's Rule))
 Having the ability to store energy as fat for metabolism
 Have shortened extremities
 Have countercurrent blood flow in extremities – this is where the warm arterial blood travelling to the limb passes the cooler venous blood from the limb and heat is exchanged warming the venous blood and cooling the arterial (e.g., Arctic wolf or penguins)
In warm environments, birds and mammals employ the following adaptations and strategies to maximize heat loss:
 Behavioural adaptations like living in burrows during the day and being nocturnal
 Evaporative cooling by perspiration and panting
 Storing fat reserves in one place (e.g., camel's hump) to avoid its insulating effect
 Elongated, often vascularized extremities to conduct body heat to the air

In humans

As in other mammals, thermoregulation is an important aspect of human homeostasis. Most body heat is generated in the deep organs, especially the liver, brain, and heart, and in contraction of skeletal muscles. Humans have been able to adapt to a great diversity of climates, including hot humid and hot arid. High temperatures pose serious stresses for the human body, placing it in great danger of injury or even death. For example, one of the most common reactions to hot temperatures is heat exhaustion, which is an illness that could happen if one is exposed to high temperatures, resulting in some symptoms such as dizziness, fainting, or a rapid heartbeat. For humans, adaptation to varying climatic conditions includes both physiological mechanisms resulting from evolution and behavioural mechanisms resulting from conscious cultural adaptations. The physiological control of the body's core temperature takes place primarily through the hypothalamus, which assumes the role as the body's "thermostat". This organ possesses control mechanisms as well as key temperature sensors, which are connected to nerve cells called thermoreceptors. Thermoreceptors come in two subcategories; ones that respond to cold temperatures and ones that respond to warm temperatures. Scattered throughout the body in both peripheral and central nervous systems, these nerve cells are sensitive to changes in temperature and are able to provide useful information to the hypothalamus through the process of negative feedback, thus maintaining a constant core temperature.

There are four avenues of heat loss: evaporation, convection, conduction, and radiation. If skin temperature is greater than that of the surrounding air temperature, the body can lose heat by convection and conduction. But, if air temperature of the surroundings is greater than that of the skin, the body gains heat by convection and conduction. In such conditions, the only means by which the body can rid itself of heat is by evaporation. So, when the surrounding temperature is higher than the skin temperature, anything that prevents adequate evaporation will cause the internal body temperature to rise. During intense physical activity (e.g. sports), evaporation becomes the main avenue of heat loss. Humidity affects thermoregulation by limiting sweat evaporation and thus heat loss.

In reptiles 
Thermoregulation is also an integral part of a reptile's life, specifically lizards such as the Microlophus occipitalis and Ctenophorus decresii who must change microhabitats to keep a constant body temperature. By moving to cooler areas when it is too hot and to warmer areas when it is cold, they can thermoregulate their temperature to stay within their necessary bounds.

In plants
Thermogenesis occurs in the flowers of many plants in the family Araceae as well as in cycad cones. Heat is produced by breaking down the starch that was stored in their roots, which requires the consumption of oxygen at a rate approaching that of a flying hummingbird.

One possible explanation for plant thermoregulation is to provide protection against cold temperature. For example, the skunk cabbage is not frost-resistant, yet it begins to grow and flower when there is still snow on the ground. Another theory is that thermogenicity helps attract pollinators, which is borne out by observations that heat production is accompanied by the arrival of beetles or flies.

Some plants are known to protect themselves against colder temperatures using antifreeze proteins. This occurs in wheat (Triticum aestivum), potatoes (Solanum tuberosum) and several other angiosperm species.

Behavioral temperature regulation
Animals other than humans regulate and maintain their body temperature with physiological adjustments and behavior. Desert lizards are ectotherms and so unable to metabolically control their temperature but can do this by altering their location. They may do this, in the morning only by raising their head from its burrow and then exposing their entire body. By basking in the sun, the lizard absorbs solar heat. It may also absorb heat by conduction from heated rocks that have stored radiant solar energy. To lower their temperature, lizards exhibit varied behaviors. They also go to their burrows to avoid cooling when the sun goes down or the temperature falls. Aquatic animals can also regulate their temperature behaviorally by changing their position in the thermal gradient. Sprawling prone in a cool shady spot, "splooting," has been observed in squirrels on hot days.

Animals also engage in kleptothermy in which they share or even steal each other's body warmth. In endotherms such as bats and birds (such as the mousebird and emperor penguin) it allows the sharing of body heat (particularly amongst juveniles). This allows the individuals to increase their thermal inertia (as with gigantothermy) and so reduce heat loss. Some ectotherms share burrows of ectotherms. Other animals exploit termite mounds.

Some animals living in cold environments maintain their body temperature by preventing heat loss. Their fur grows more densely to increase the amount of insulation. This minimizes heat loss through less insulated body parts, like the legs, feet (or hooves), and nose.

Different species of Sonoran Desert Drosophila will exploit different species of cacti based on the thermotolerance differences between species and hosts. For example, Drosophila mettleri is found in cacti like the Saguaro and Senita; these two cacti remain cool by storing water. Over time, the genes selecting for higher heat tolerance were reduced in the population due to the cooler host climate the fly is able to exploit.

Some flies, such as Lucilia sericata, lay their eggs en masse. The resulting group of larvae, depending on its size, is able to thermoregulate and keep itself at the optimum temperature for development.

Hibernation, estivation and daily torpor
To cope with limited food resources and low temperatures, some mammals hibernate during cold periods. To remain in "stasis" for long periods, these animals build up brown fat reserves and slow all body functions. True hibernators (e.g., groundhogs) keep their body temperatures low throughout hibernation whereas the core temperature of false hibernators (e.g., bears) varies; occasionally the animal may emerge from its den for brief periods. Some bats are true hibernators and rely upon a rapid, non-shivering thermogenesis of their brown fat deposit to bring them out of hibernation.

Estivation is similar to hibernation, however, it usually occurs in hot periods to allow animals to avoid high temperatures and desiccation. Both terrestrial and aquatic invertebrate and vertebrates enter into estivation. Examples include lady beetles (Coccinellidae), North American desert tortoises, crocodiles, salamanders, cane toads, and the water-holding frog.

Daily torpor occurs in small endotherms like bats and hummingbirds, which temporarily reduces their high metabolic rates to conserve energy.

Variation in animals

Normal human temperature

Variations (one standard deviation) from three other studies are:
 
  for males, for females
 

Measured temperature varies according to thermometer placement, with rectal temperature being  higher than oral temperature, while axillary temperature is  lower than oral temperature. The average difference between oral and axillary temperatures of Indian children aged 6–12 was found to be only 0.1 °C (standard deviation 0.2 °C), and the mean difference in Maltese children aged 4–14 between oral and axillary temperature was 0.56 °C, while the mean difference between rectal and axillary temperature for children under 4 years old was 0.38 °C.

Variations due to circadian rhythms
In humans, a diurnal variation has been observed dependent on the periods of rest and activity, lowest at 11 p.m. to 3 a.m. and peaking at 10 a.m. to 6 p.m. Monkeys also have a well-marked and regular diurnal variation of body temperature that follows periods of rest and activity, and is not dependent on the incidence of day and night; nocturnal monkeys reach their highest body temperature at night and lowest during the day. Sutherland Simpson and J.J. Galbraith observed that all nocturnal animals and birds – whose periods of rest and activity are naturally reversed through habit and not from outside interference – experience their highest temperature during the natural period of activity (night) and lowest during the period of rest (day). Those diurnal temperatures can be reversed by reversing their daily routine.

In essence, the temperature curve of diurnal birds is similar to that of humans and other homoeothermic animals, except that the maximum occurs earlier in the afternoon and the minimum earlier in the morning. Also, the curves obtained from rabbits, guinea pigs, and dogs were quite similar to those from humans. These observations indicate that body temperature is partially regulated by circadian rhythms.

Variations due to human menstrual cycles
Within 24 hours of ovulation, women experience an elevation of  due to the increased metabolic rate caused by sharply elevated levels of progesterone. The basal body temperature ranges between  throughout the luteal phase, and drops down to pre-ovulatory levels within a few days of menstruation. Women can chart this phenomenon to determine whether and when they are ovulating, so as to aid conception or contraception.

Variations due to fever
Fever is a regulated elevation of the set point of core temperature in the hypothalamus, caused by circulating pyrogens produced by the immune system. To the subject, a rise in core temperature due to fever may result in feeling cold in an environment where people without fever do not.

Variations due to biofeedback
Some monks are known to practice Tummo, biofeedback meditation techniques, that allow them to raise their body temperatures substantially.

Effect on lifespan 
The effects of such a genetic change in body temperature on longevity is difficult to study in humans.

Limits compatible with life 
There are limits both of heat and cold that an endothermic animal can bear and other far wider limits that an ectothermic animal may endure and yet live. The effect of too extreme a cold is to decrease metabolism, and hence to lessen the production of heat. Both catabolic and anabolic pathways share in this metabolic depression, and, though less energy is used up, still less energy is generated. The effects of this diminished metabolism become telling on the central nervous system first, especially the brain and those parts concerning consciousness; both heart rate and respiration rate decrease; judgment becomes impaired as drowsiness supervenes, becoming steadily deeper until the individual loses consciousness; without medical intervention, death by hypothermia quickly follows. Occasionally, however, convulsions may set in towards the end, and death is caused by asphyxia.

In experiments on cats performed by Sutherland Simpson and Percy T. Herring, the animals were unable to survive when rectal temperature fell below . At this low temperature, respiration became increasingly feeble; heart-impulse usually continued after respiration had ceased, the beats becoming very irregular, appearing to cease, then beginning again. Death appeared to be mainly due to asphyxia, and the only certain sign that it had taken place was the loss of knee-jerks.

However, too high a temperature speeds up the metabolism of different tissues to such a rate that their metabolic capital is soon exhausted. Blood that is too warm produces dyspnea by exhausting the metabolic capital of the respiratory centre; heart rate is increased; the beats then become arrhythmic and eventually cease. The central nervous system is also profoundly affected by hyperthermia and delirium, and convulsions may set in. Consciousness may also be lost, propelling the person into a comatose condition. These changes can sometimes also be observed in patients experiencing an acute fever. Mammalian muscle becomes rigid with heat rigor at about 50 °C, with the sudden rigidity of the whole body rendering life impossible.

H.M. Vernon performed work on the death temperature and paralysis temperature (temperature of heat rigor) of various animals. He found that species of the same class showed very similar temperature values, those from the Amphibia examined being 38.5 °C, fish 39 °C, reptiles 45 °C, and various molluscs 46 °C. Also, in the case of pelagic animals, he showed a relation between death temperature and the quantity of solid constituents of the body. In higher animals, however, his experiments tend to show that there is greater variation in both the chemical and physical characteristics of the protoplasm and, hence, greater variation in the extreme temperature compatible with life.

Arthropoda
The maximum temperatures tolerated by certain thermophilic arthropods exceeds the lethal temperatures for most vertebrates.

The most heat-resistant insects are three genera of desert ants recorded from three different parts of the world.

In April 2014, the South Californian mite Paratarsotomus macropalpis has been recorded as the world's fastest land animal relative to body length, at a speed of 322 body lengths per second. In addition, the mites are able to stop and change direction very quickly.

Spiders like Nephila pilipes exhibits active thermal regulation behavior. During high temperature sunny days, it aligns its body with the direction of sunlight to reduce the body area under direct sunlight.

See also
 Human body temperature
 Innate heat
 Insect thermoregulation
 Thermal neutral zone

References

Further reading

 
  full pdf
  This cites work of Simpson & Galbraith
  Other Internet Archive listings
  see Table of Contents link (Previously Guyton's Textbook of Medical Physiology. Earlier editions back to at least 5th edition 1976, contain useful information on the subject of thermoregulation, the concepts of which have changed little in that time).
 
 
  link to abstract
 
 
 
 
 
 
 Weldon Owen Pty Ltd. (1993). Encyclopedia of animals – Mammals, Birds, Reptiles, Amphibians. Reader's Digest Association, Inc. Pages 567–568. .

External links

 
 Royal Institution Christmas Lectures 1998 
 
 

 
Human homeostasis
Animal physiology
Heat transfer
Articles containing video clips
Mathematics in medicine